A Celebration: The Music of Pete Townshend and The Who, also known as Daltrey Sings Townshend, is a music event and a later live album by Roger Daltrey (of English rock band The Who) documenting a two-night concert at Carnegie Hall in February 1994.

Overview
The music event broke Carnegie Hall's two-day box office gross record, and was the fastest sell-out in the historic venue's history. The concert also raised money for Columbia Presbyterian Babies Hospital. This event was produced by Richard Flanzer and Roger Daltrey in celebration of Daltrey's 50th birthday. The Who's music was arranged for orchestra by Michael Kamen, who directed The Juilliard Orchestra for the event. Pete Townshend, John Entwistle, Eddie Vedder, Sinéad O'Connor, Lou Reed, David Sanborn, Alice Cooper, Linda Perry, The Chieftains and others performed as special guests.

The event was followed by a major tour of the same name including John Entwistle on bass, Zak Starkey on drums and Simon Townshend on guitar. Although the tour was considered an artistic success, it didn't earn enough profit in several cities to cover high expenses, so it  was concluded early. However, it did serve the purpose of attracting attention to songs from The Who's Quadrophenia, and gathered support for a staging and major tour of the rock opera in 1996-1997.

In 1994, Daltrey's manager, Richard Flanzer, made a $450,000 deal to record and film the two nights of Carnegie Hall performances with Tim Brack (President of Continuum Records) with direction credited to Michael Lindsay-Hogg. The CD was released on Continuum 19402 USA. Edited by Alan Miller, a DVD was released 14 July 1998.
The vocal contribution of Sinéad O'Connor on "Baba O'Riley" and "After The Fire" were edited from the CD, but included on the DVD.

Track listing 
All songs were written by Pete Townshend. The track listing for the CD and video is as follows:

 Overture (7:26)
 Pinball Wizard (3:19)
 Imagine a Man (4:29)
 Doctor Jimmy (6:15)
 The Song Is Over (5:43)
 The Real Me (4:42)
 Baba O'Riley (6:42)
 After the Fire (5:12)
 5:15 (5:58)
 The Sea Refuses No River (6:11)
 Who Are You (6:25)
 Won't Get Fooled Again (8:07)

N.B. "Overture" is not The Who song from Tommy, but a special medley for these concerts and subsequent tour, consisting of "A Little Is Enough," "Rough Boys," "Sparks," "Dr. Jimmy" ("Is It Me?" section), "Baba O'Riley," "Who Are You," "Quadrophenia" ("Helpless Dancer" theme) and "See Me, Feel Me,"

Personnel

Band 
 Roger Daltrey – vocals
 John "Rabbit" Bundrick – keyboards
 Jon Carin – guitar, keyboards, backing vocals
 Jody Linscott – percussion
 Pino Palladino – bass
 Phil Palmer – guitar
 Simon Phillips – drums
 Billy Nicholls – backing vocals
 Cleveland Watkiss – backing vocals
 Michael Kamen –  arranger, conductor
 The Juilliard Orchestra – orchestra

Guest Stars 
 Linda Perry – vocals on "Doctor Jimmy"
 John Entwistle – bass on "The Real Me"
 The Chieftains – bodhrán, bones, fiddle, flute, Irish harp, oboe, tin whistle, Uilleann pipes on "Baba O'Riley" and "After the Fire"
 David Sanborn – saxophone on "5.15"
 Pete Townshend – guitar and vocals on "Who Are You"

Technical 
 Produced by Bob Ezrin
 Recorded by Thom Panunzio and Bob Ezrin
 Mixed by Thom Panunzio, Bob Ezrin, Martin Horenburg
 Production and Technical Supervision: Robert (Ringo) Hrycyna
 Recorded on Remote Recording's Silver Truck with David Hewitt

See also
Roger Daltrey discography

References 

Roger Daltrey albums
Live video albums
1994 live albums
1994 video albums
Albums produced by Bob Ezrin
The Who
Albums recorded at Carnegie Hall
Films directed by Michael Lindsay-Hogg
Continuum Records albums